The 2015 Season is Mumbai City's 2nd season in existence in the Indian Super League.
Mumbai City began the season on 5 October 2015 against Pune City, with the opening game of their League campaign. For 2nd season, Nicolas Anelka was announced as the marquee player as well as the manager of the club, replacing Englishman Peter Reid. Mumbai City finished their season at 6th position in ISL 2015.

Transfers and Loans

Transfers In
Note: Flags indicate national team as defined under FIFA eligibility rules. Players may hold more than one non-FIFA nationality

Transfers Out
Note: Flags indicate national team as defined under FIFA eligibility rules. Players may hold more than one non-FIFA nationality

Players and staff

Squad
As of 3 October 2015 Note: Flags indicate national team as defined under FIFA eligibility rules. Players may hold more than one non-FIFA nationality.

Coaching staff

Kit
Supplier: Puma / Sponsor: ACE Group

Indian Super League

League table

Results Summary

Results by matchday

Matches

Squad statistics

Source: Indian Super League website

Appearances

Players with no appearances not included in the list.

Goal Scorers

Clean Sheets

Hat-tricks

Disciplinary record

Home attendance

Source: Indian Super League website

Awards

Source: Indian Super League website

Hero of the Match

ISL Emerging Player of the Match

References

External links

Mumbai City FC seasons
Mumbai